Riley's Tavern, in or near New Braunfels, Texas, was listed on the National Register of Historic Places in 2018.

NRHPdocumentdraft.

The building was constructed in the 1800s, but it was not notable until it was converted into a tavern by James Curtis Riley in 1933. Located near a railroad stop on the Missouri-Pacific Railway line, and near the border of a dry county, it did well. It was the first tavern in Texas to get a license after Prohibition was lifted in 1933.

References

External links
Try http://www.rileystavern.com

National Register of Historic Places in Comal County, Texas
Buildings and structures completed in 1936
New Braunfels, Texas
Drinking establishments on the National Register of Historic Places
Drinking establishments in Texas